Kankkonen is a surname. Notable people with the surname include:

Anssi Kankkonen (born 1968), Finnish golfer
Johan Kankkonen (1886–1955),  Finnish road racing cyclist
Veikko Kankkonen (born in 1940), Finnish ski jumper

See also
 Kakkonen